Mordellistena kubani is a beetle in the genus Mordellistena of the family Mordellidae. It was described in 1982 by Horak.

References

kubani
Beetles described in 1982